Wittman Regional Airport  is a county-owned public-use airport located two nautical miles (4 km) south of the central business district of Oshkosh, a city in Winnebago County, Wisconsin, United States. A large portion at the south end of the airport is located in the town of Nekimi. It is located adjacent to Pioneer Airport, part of the EAA Aviation Museum.

The airport was named after pioneer air racer, aircraft designer and builder Steve Wittman in 1972. Originally named Winnebago County Airport, the name Steve Wittman Field was proposed in 1968, and it is also known as Wittman Field.

It is included in the Federal Aviation Administration (FAA) National Plan of Integrated Airport Systems for 2023–2027, in which it is categorized as a regional general aviation facility.

History
The airport has serviced aircraft as large as the Boeing 747, Boeing 767, Airbus A380, Concorde and Boeing B-52 Stratofortress.
The airport has been served by commercial airlines in the past. Until 1980, Wittman boarded more passengers than nearby Appleton International Airport, and was the commercial air hub of the Fox Cities.

Historical air service
Wittman was served at various times by Wisconsin Central Airlines, North Central, Republic, Air Wisconsin, American Central, Midstate Airlines, Northwest Airlink, United Express, Midway Connection, Skyway, and Great Lakes. Service was subsidized by the Essential Air Service program until March 2003, when it was terminated due to federal law not allowing a subsidy over $200 per passenger for communities located within 210 miles of the nearest large or medium hub airport (Milwaukee Mitchell International Airport, a medium hub serving Milwaukee).

Facilities and aircraft
Wittman Regional Airport covers an area of 1,392 acres (563 ha) at an elevation of 808 feet (246 m) above mean sea level. It has four paved runways: 18/36 is 8,002 by 150 feet (2,439 x 46 m); 9/27 is 6,179 by 150 feet (1,883 x 46 m); 5/23 is 3,423 by 75 feet (1,043 x 23 m); 13/31 is 3,061 by 75 feet (933 x 23 m).

In developing their 2020 Master Plan, the airport studied the closure of either runway 5/23, 13/31, or possibly both.

During EAA AirVenture Oshkosh, two additional temporary runways are in operation to accommodate the high volume of traffic of numerous aircraft sizes and types: a portion of Taxiway A to the east of runway 18/36 becomes Runway 18L/36R (Runway 18/36 is re-designated 18R/36L and shortened to 6,700 feet) and a small grass runway (1,200 x 100 feet (366 x 30 m)) on the southern end of the airport is used to host ultralight aircraft. Runways 5/23 and 13/31 are closed during AirVenture.

For the 12-month period ending December 31, 2021, the airport had 80,102 aircraft operations, an average of 219 per day: 97% general aviation, 3% air taxi and less than 1% military, though the EAA AirVenture airshow accounts for a large number of the annual operations. In January 2023, there were 170 aircraft based at this airport: 131 single-engine, 28 multi-engine, 10 jet and 1 helicopter.

As with many larger airports, Wittman Field's expansion over the years has necessitated the closure of nearby roadways and acquisition of nearby parcels of land. In particular, Knapp Street (running parallel to the runways) has been permanently closed near the airport to facilitate the expansion of the grounds in that area (for the annual EAA AirVenture.)

The EAA has a hangar on the northwestern side of the field which does most of the maintenance, overhaul, and restoration to their many aircraft including: Bell 47, Ford Trimotor, B-25, Cessna 162s, RV-12s, and its B-17 (Aluminum Overcast).

The airport has three flight schools; Aviation Services, Discover Flight, and Fox Valley Technical College. In addition, the EAA offers limited sport pilot camps/classes to its members at the field.

Control tower
The original tower at Wittman Field opened in 1963. In 2007, a new tower was built that is over twice the height of the old building. The original tower was demolished in April 2009.

Improvements
In 2015-2016 the 50-year-old taxiway B was completely rebuilt with concrete pavement; as part of the project LED lighting was added to the taxiway.

The airport is currently working on replacing most of taxiway A in a phased plan along runway 18/36; the project also added an entrance to a proposed South GA ramp to serve the airport's Aviation Business Park. Due to the cancelation of AirVenture 2020, the project schedule was able to be revised to allow construction to be completed by the end of 2020.

On July 16, 2020, the airport began a project to replace the aging GA terminal as well as the old airline terminal built in 1958 and 1971 respectively with a new modern GA terminal. The high cost to maintain both facilities, as well as the lack of interest from airlines to bring back service favoring Appleton International Airport leaving no need for an airline terminal as the primary reasons to replace the terminal. The new terminal opened in July 2021 in time for AirVenture 2021.

Cargo operations
 
Freight Runners Express offers scheduled cargo service from the airport. They utilize their Beechcraft Model 99 aircraft type for Oshkosh cargo operations.

Airshow
The airport is the site of the annual Experimental Aircraft Association's AirVenture Oshkosh, an experimental aircraft and sport aviation airshow. Across Knapp St. to the west lies the campus of the EAA AirVenture Museum. For the week of AirVenture Oshkosh (known locally as "The Airshow" or "The Fly-in"), Wittman Regional is the world's busiest airport by traffic movements.

Images

See also 
 List of airports in Wisconsin

References

Other sources 

 Essential Air Service documents (Docket OST-1999-5712) from the U.S. Department of Transportation:
 Ninety Day Notice (August 17, 1999) of Great Lakes Aviation, Ltd. of intent to terminate unsubsidized air service at Oshkosh, Wisconsin.
 Order 99-8-11 (August 13, 1999): prohibits Great Lakes Aviation Ltd., d/b/a United Express, from suspending its essential air service at Oshkosh, Wisconsin, at the end of its 90-day notice period, and requires it to maintain air service through September 16, 1999; and requests proposals from interested carriers to provide replacement service at the community, with or without subsidy.
 Order 99-10-6 (October 6, 1999):setting a final subsidy rate of $460,391 for Great Lakes Aviation, Ltd., d/b/a United Express, for its provision of subsidized essential air service at Oshkosh, Wisconsin, from August 18, 1999, until further Department action.
 Order 2002-10-26 (October 22, 2002: re-solicits proposals from carriers interested in providing replacement service at Oshkosh, Wisconsin.
 Order 2002-12-24 (December 31, 2002): tentatively terminating the subsidy eligibility of Oshkosh, Wisconsin, under the Essential Air Service program because the subsidy per passenger exceeds the $200 per passenger statutory ceiling and the community is less than 210 highway miles from the medium hub airport at Milwaukee, also setting past-period subsidy rates retroactive to October 1, 2001, for service provided by Great Lakes Aviation, Ltd.
 Order 2003-2-20 (February 25, 2003): finalizing its earlier, tentative decision in Order 2002-12-24 to terminate the subsidy eligibility of Oshkosh, Wisconsin, under the essential air service (EAS) program because the subsidy exceeds the $200 per passenger statutory ceiling.

External links

  at Wisconsin Airport Directory
  at Michigan Airport Directory
 Aerial image as of May 1992 from USGS The National Map
 
 

Experimental Aircraft Association
Airports in Wisconsin
Buildings and structures in Winnebago County, Wisconsin
Transportation in Winnebago County, Wisconsin
Former Essential Air Service airports